Joseph Coleman Zeno, Jr. (born November 18, 1946) is a former professional American football player who played wide receiver in 1971 for the New York Giants.

External links
Pro-Football-Reference

1946 births
Living people
Players of American football from New Orleans
American football wide receivers
Grambling State Tigers football players
New York Giants players